Petrus may refer to:

People
 Petrus (given name)
 Petrus (surname)
 Petrus Borel, pen name of Joseph-Pierre Borel d'Hauterive (1809–1859), French Romantic writer
 Petrus Brovka, pen name of Pyotr Ustinovich Brovka (1905–1980), Soviet Belarusian poet

Other uses
 Château Pétrus, a Pomerol Bordeaux wine producer
 Petrus (fish), a genus of ray-finned fish
 Petrus (beer), a brand of beer
 Pétrus (restaurant), London
 Pétrus (film), a 1946 French comedy film
 Petrus, a band with Ruthann Friedman that performed in 1968 in the San Francisco area

See also
 Petrus killings, a series of executions in Indonesia between 1983 and 1985
 Petrus method, a speedcubing method